Y Dafarn Goch in the parish of Llanfair Mathafarn Eithaf, Anglesey, Wales was the birthplace of the poet Goronwy Owen (Goronwy Ddu o Fôn) (1723–69).

References

Buildings and structures in Anglesey